Bromus racemosus, the smooth brome or bald brome, is a species of flowering plant in the family Poaceae. It is native to subarctic and temperate Eurasia, and widely introduced elsewhere, including North America, Iceland, the Southern Cone of South America, the Korean Peninsula, Australia, and New Zealand. It grows in alkaline meadows and in waste places.

Description

The margins of the blades are smooth or serrulate. Each branch has a single spikelet, with the lowest inflorescence node having one to four branches. The spikelets have six to nine florets. The lower glumes have three to five nerves, upper glumes have seven to nine nerves, and lemmas have seven to nine nerves.

Habitat and distribution

In its native Europe, Bromus racemosus occurs in moist meadows and grasslands, though it is threatened by changes in agricultural grassland management. In its introduced habitat in North America, B. racemosus occurs in waste places, fields, roadsides, and gravelly hills in scattered locations throughout the United States and Canada. In South America, the grass occurs in the southern Andes of Argentina and Chile.

References

racemosus
Flora of the Azores
Flora of Europe
Flora of the East Aegean Islands
Flora of Turkey
Flora of the Caucasus
Flora of Iran
Flora of Afghanistan
Flora of East Himalaya
Flora of Central Asia
Flora of Xinjiang
Flora of Tibet
Flora of Qinghai
Flora of North-Central China
Taxa named by Carl Linnaeus
Plants described in 1762